Christian Andersen (born 28 September 1944) is a Danish former football player and now manager. He was most recently the manager of Boldklubben Frem

As player he played for B 1903, Cercle Brugge, FC Lorient and Akademisk Boldklub and played two caps for the Danish national football team.

As manager he has managed Akademisk Boldklub a couple of times, but he is most famous for his controversies with FC Copenhagen chairman Flemming Østergaard and former chairman of Akademisk Boldklub, Per Frimann. The first controversy was about Andersen being fired as manager of FC Copenhagen after only one match, and the other because Andersen in his autobiography called Frimann the reason why AB had had economic problems. Frimann began talking about a possible lawsuit, but this was solved, when Andersen made a public apology.

References

External links
Danish national team profile

1944 births
Living people
Danish men's footballers
Denmark international footballers
Denmark under-21 international footballers
Danish football managers
Royale Union Saint-Gilloise players
Cercle Brugge K.S.V. players
FC Lorient players
Akademisk Boldklub players
Akademisk Boldklub managers
F.C. Copenhagen managers
Boldklubben af 1893 managers
FC Nordsjælland managers
Boldklubben Frem managers
Footballers from Copenhagen
Association football defenders
Danish 1st Division managers